The 2008–09 Lega Pro Prima Divisione season is the thirty-first since its renaming to Serie C1 in 1978, and the first edition since the renaming from Serie C1 to Lega Pro.  It was divided into two phases: the regular season, played from September 2008 to May 2009, and the playoff phase from May to June 2009.

The league was composed of 36 teams divided into two divisions of 18 teams each, whose teams was divided mainly according to geographical principles.  Teams will play only other teams in their own division, once at home and once away for a total of 34 matches.

Teams finishing first in the regular season, plus one team winning the playoff round from each division, were promoted to Serie B; teams finishing last in the regular season, plus two relegation playoff losers from each division was relegated to Lega Pro Seconda Divisione.  In all, four teams was promoted to Serie B, and six teams were relegated to Lega Pro Seconda Divisione.

Events

Start of season
The league was to feature four teams relegated from Serie B in 2007–08; Avellino, Ravenna, Spezia, and Cesena.  Two vacancies were created with the re-admission of Avellino to Serie B, and the bankruptcy of Spezia.

It featured six teams promoted from 2007–08 Serie C2: Pergocrema, Reggiana, Benevento, Lumezzane, Portosummaga, and Marcianise.

The remaining 26 teams were to come from the teams that played in 2007–08 Serie C1 that were neither promoted nor relegated. Of those, Lucchese (8th in Girone B), and Massese (13th in Girone B) were also banned creating two more vacancies.

Three of the four vacancies were filled by Virtus Lanciano, Pro Patria and Lecco which had lost in last year's Serie C1 relegation playoffs and were destined to play in Lega Pro Seconda Divisione.  The fourth vacancy was filled by SPAL, which lost in last year's Serie C2 promotional playoffs and was thus destined to remain there.

Promotions
Cesena won direct promotion to Serie B for the 2009–10 season by finishing first in Girone A.  Just one year ago Cesena was directly relegated from the same Serie B for finishing in last place. Gallipoli also won direct promotion to Serie B by being crowned champions in Girone B.  It was Gallipoli's third consecutive year in Lega Pro Prima Divisione/C1 after winning promotion from Serie C2 in 2005–06.

Relegations
Legnano and Potenza were the first two teams relegated by finishing last in their respective divisions.  Both teams had been in Prima Divisione/C1 for two consecutive years after winning promotion from 2006–07 Serie C2.

Four teams were relegated by losing in the relegation playoffs.  Pro Sesto was relegated after 4 seasons in Prima Divisione/C1, winning promotion from C2 in 2004–05.  Pro Sesto was forced to play in the playouts two other times, winning one and losing the other in 2006, but asked to remain in C1 to fill vacancies.  Sambenedettese also lost in the Girone A playouts after 7 seasons in Prima Divisione/C1, winning promotion from C2 in 2001–02.

In Girone B, Pistoiese and Juve Stabia lost in the relegation playoffs.  Pistoiese had been in 2001–02 Serie B, and after being relegated that year, spent the next 7 years in Prima Divisione/C1.  Juve Stabia was promoted from C2 2004–05, spending the next four seasons in C1/Lega Pro.

Teams
On 14 August 2008 the following clubs were confirmed to be competing in the division:

Girone A

Girone B

League tables

Girone A

Girone B

Promotion and relegation playoffs

Girone A

Promotion
Promotion playoff semifinals
First legs played 31 May 2009; return legs played 7 June 2009

Promotion playoff finals
First legs played 14 June 2009; return legs played 21 June 2009

Padova promoted to Serie B

Relegation
Relegation playoffs
First legs played 31 May 2009; return legs played 7 June 2009

Pro Sesto and Sambenedettese relegated to Lega Pro Seconda Divisione

Girone B

Promotion
Promotion playoff semifinals
First legs played 31 May 2009; return legs played 7 June 2009

Promotion playoff finals
First legs played 14 June 2009; return legs played 21 June 2009

Crotone promoted to Serie B

Relegation
Relegation playoffs
First legs played 31 May 2009; return legs played 7 June 2009

Juve Stabia and Pistoiese relegated to Lega Pro Seconda Divisione

References

Lega Pro Prima Divisione seasons
Italy
3